Stephen Wright Kellogg (b. Shelburne, Massachusetts, April 5, 1822 – d. Waterbury, Connecticut, January 27, 1904) was an American politician, attorney, military officer and judge.

He worked on his father's farm until he was twenty, in the winter attending or teaching school. In the fall of 1842 he entered Amherst College, but remained there only two terms; then he joined the class of 1846 at Yale College, where he was a member of Skull and Bones and was graduated with highest honors. Among his classmates and fellow Bonesmen was the Hon. Henry Baldwin Harrison, his lifelong friend.

After a few months of school teaching he entered the Yale Law School, and was admitted to the bar in June, 1848. First he began to practice in Naugatuck, Connecticut, where he remained until 1854, and then having been elected judge of probate for the district of Waterbury, he removed to that then small city. He held this office for seven years. In 1854 the legislature appointed him judge of the New Haven County Court. From 1866 to 1869, and 1877 to 1883, he was the City Attorney of Waterbury, Connecticut; and until a short time before his death he was constantly occupied in the practice of his profession.

Meantime his active mind and restless energy found congenial occupation in the stirring political events of the times. In 1851 he was clerk of the Connecticut State Senate; in 1853 a senator himself; in 1856 a member of the House; and he was a delegate to the Republican National Conventions of 1860, of 1868, and of 1876. Three times he was elected to US Congress from the usually Democratic second district, and his perseverance and success in protecting and advancing both the public and personal interests of his constituents were remarkable.  In 1875, he lost his bid for re-election to James Phelps, but even in this election Kellogg received over 45% of the vote.

He was Colonel of the Second Regiment, Connecticut National Guard, from 1863 to 1866, and Brigadier-General from 1866 to 1870. He was the author and promoter of legislation organizing the active militia in an efficient body known as the Connecticut National Guard. He never lost interest in public affairs, and to them, until within a few weeks of his death, aged 81, his voice and pen were often devoted.

He died on January 27, 1904, in Waterbury and was interred at Riverside Cemetery.

Notes

External links

1822 births
1904 deaths
Burials at Riverside Cemetery (Waterbury, Connecticut)
Connecticut state court judges
People from Shelburne, Massachusetts
Politicians from Waterbury, Connecticut
People of Connecticut in the American Civil War
Republican Party Connecticut state senators
Republican Party members of the Connecticut House of Representatives
Yale Law School alumni
Republican Party members of the United States House of Representatives from Connecticut
Military personnel from Connecticut
19th-century American politicians
Yale College alumni
19th-century American judges